Addy Cecilia Joaquín Coldwell (born  24 August 1939) is a Mexican politician from Cozumel, Quintana Roo.

Her brother Pedro Joaquín Coldwell is a former Governor of Quintana Roo. During her brother's governorship she served as president of the DIF (Desarrollo Integral de la Familia) in Quintana Roo, then when her husband Edmundo Fernández was the mayor of Benito Juárez, Quintana Roo (the municipality that includes the resort city of Cancún), she served as municipal first lady and president of the DIF.

Joaquín Coldwell is a former member of the Institutional Revolutionary Party (PRI). She has served in the Chamber of Deputies (representing Quintana Roo's First District from 1997 to 2000) and in the Senate.

In 1998 she tried to obtain her party's candidacy to the governorship of Quintana Roo for the 1999 elections but lost against Joaquín Ernesto Hendricks Díaz.  In 2004 after losing again the PRI candidacy for the 2005 elections she broke with the PRI and ran for the governorship as the candidate of the National Action Party (PAN) and Convergence.  She lost to the PRI candidate Félix González Canto.  In the general election of 2 July 2006, she was elected to the Chamber of Deputies for the PAN, representing the Third Circumscription via proportional representation.

References

1939 births
Living people
Members of the Chamber of Deputies (Mexico)
Members of the Senate of the Republic (Mexico)
Politicians from Quintana Roo
People from Cozumel
Women members of the Senate of the Republic (Mexico)
Institutional Revolutionary Party politicians
National Action Party (Mexico) politicians
Mexican people of English descent
Mexican people of Lebanese descent
21st-century Mexican politicians
21st-century Mexican women politicians
Women members of the Chamber of Deputies (Mexico)
20th-century Mexican politicians
20th-century Mexican women politicians